= Patrick Lassine =

Luxembourgish footballer

Personal information
- Date of birth: 28 December 1982 (age 43)
- Position: Defender

Senior career*
Years	Team	Apps	(Gls)
2001–2002	SC Tétange		
2002–2005	Jeunesse Esch		

International career
2003–2004	Luxembourg	3	(0)
- * Club domestic league appearances and goals

Patrick Lassine (born 28 December 1982) is a retired Luxembourgish football defender.
